Sarpatta Parambarai, or simply known as Sarpatta, is a 2021 Indian Tamil-language period sports action film directed by Pa. Ranjith, who also co-produced the film under his banner Neelam Productions, along with Shanmugam Dhakshanaraj of K9 Studios. The film stars Arya, John Kokken, Shabeer Kallarakkal, Dushara Vijayan, Pasupathy, Anupama Kumar and Sanchana Natarajan. Set in the 1970s, the film revolves around a clash between two clans namely Idiyappa Parambarai and Sarpatta Parambarai in North Chennai, which also showcases the boxing culture in the locality and the politics involved in it.

Pa. Ranjith shelved his biopic drama based on the life of Birsa Munda, and wrote this script with Karthi in mind, but due to his prior commitments, he later approached Arya to play the lead role. The film was eventually supposed to begin production in during February and March 2020, after the intensive training sessions of the actors being involved in the film, but due to the COVID-19 pandemic induced lockdown, the production delayed further and eventually began in September 2020 which was completed within December 2020, with filming took place for nearly four months in and around North Chennai. The film's technical crew comprises music director Santhosh Narayanan, cinematographer Murali G. and editor Selva R. K.

Sarpatta Parambarai was originally scheduled for theatrical release was delayed due to the COVID-19 pandemic, which as a result, the makers opted for a direct-to-digital release, and the streaming rights were acquired by Amazon Prime Video. The film released through the streaming service on 22 July 2021, coinciding the Prime Day celebrations and received critical acclaim praising the characterisation and performances of the lead cast members(particularly Arya, Kalaiyarasan, Anupama, Pasupathy, Shabeer and John Kokken), direction, story, screenplay, music, cinematography and other major technical aspects of the film. Critics further praised Ranjith for the setting and realistic portrayal of North Madras and the 1970s boxing culture. In March 2023, a sequel was announced, with Pa. Ranjith returning as the director, and Arya returning in the lead role

Plot 
In North Madras (Karuppar Nagaram/ Perumparacheri) in the early 1970s, Kabilan is a Dalit labourer at the Madras Port who wants to become a prominent boxer like his father Munirathnam. But his mother Bakkiyam refuses to let him do so, as Munirathnam's fighting prowess led him to be killed in an ambush by a rival gang. Kevin (nicknamed 'Daddy'), an Anglo-Indian friend of Kabilan's father, and who Bakkiyam works for, has been supporting Kabilan's passion since his childhood as his godfather.

In 1975, when Indira Gandhi declares the 18-month Emergency, Rangan, a former boxer, coach and DMK member manages to host a boxing tournament between the Sarpatta and Idiyappan clans. At that tournament, Sarpatta clan faces a massive shock after Meeran, their main bout boxer, gets defeated by Vembuli, a talented boxer representing the rival Idiyappan clan. Afterwards, Rangan announces that he will bring up a prominent boxer to defeat Vembuli the following match, and accepts the condition that the Sarpatta clan would never fight again if they face defeat. Rangan announces that Raman, an amateur boxer will battle against Vembuli, much to the disapproval of the other clan members especially Rangan's son Vetri. Later, Rangan gets dissatisfied by Raman's performance in the training sessions. After Raman insults Rangan, Kabilan, who hears of it, floors Raman black and blue.

Impressed by Kabilan's fighting ability and techniques, Rangan decides to match him up against Vembuli instead. The Idiyappan clan scoffs at the idea of Kabilan as a challenge to Vembuli. After a heated debate Daddy challenges Rose, a legendary retired boxer nicknamed 'Dancing Rose' for his dance-like moves with elegant foot movements, to fight Kabilan. Rose is loved by the crowd and has respect even from the opponents. The upcoming fight soon becomes the talk of the town and the fans dismiss Kabilan as a tomato can. Kabilan manages to defeat Rose, much to the surprise and dismay of the audience. Enraged, Vembuli challenges Kabilan to defeat him in the ring. Raman's uncle Thaniga, who feuded with Kabilan's father in the past, plots against Kabilan for humiliating Raman. He tells Vembuli that he would help him if he is on verge of losing. In the match, Kabilan dominates Vembuli most of the match and almost knocks him out in fourth round. The fifth (last) round starts, but is stopped suddenly as the police come into the venue to arrest Rangan, as the DMK government has been dismissed minutes ago by the Central government and Governor has ordered the arrest of all prominent DMK leaders. Everyone refuses to move until the match ends, and the police wait for the last round to end. The last round resumes, and as Kabilan is to give the final blow to the tired and hopeless Vembuli, Thaniga's goons attacks Kabilan and interrupt the match. Goons attack all the spectators and strip Kabilan naked on stage. The match ends in no result. Rangan and other party members are immediately jailed under the MISA Act. Kabilan is injured in back of the head, but recovers.

Kabilan decides to quit boxing after the incident and plans to live a modest life with his mother and his wife Mariyamma. Kabilan and Vetri go to meet Rangan in prison. On the way, the two meet Thaniga as they stop by a restaurant, who provokes Kabilan. In a fit of rage, Kabilan hacks Thaniga's mouth with a sword, he gets imprisoned for six months, though Thaniga survives. In 1978, Vetri Selvan joined the ruling AIADMK, led by Chief minister M. G. Ramachandran,. He and Kabilan initially work under Manja Kannan to brew illegal liquor, and eventually start their own brewing business due to Vetri's clout in the party. Vetri, despite growing rich, employs Kabilan as his mere henchman. Kabilan slowly slips into alcoholism which strains his relationship with his mother and his wife.

Rangan is released from prison in 1979 and is disturbed by the changes. Kabilan, now overweight and addicted to alcohol, attends the boxing match between Raman and Vembuli, where the former gets defeated thoroughly. Post match, Vembuli gets challenged by Kabilan and Daddy due to his intentional disruption before. An embarrassed Vembuli accepts but Rangan wants to use another boxer instead, due to Kabilan's lack of fitness and flexibility. However Kabilan stands his ground and insists the fight go on. Vetri asks him to join the liquor trade full time, but is angrily rejected. Kabilan wails to Bakkiyam over the fact that he failed both as a family member and a boxer. Bakkiyam, tells Kabilan to resume boxing to redeem himself (She prevented him from boxing earlier, because she did not want him to become a thug). The following day, Daddy sends Kabilan to train under 'Beedi' Rayappan, a fisherman, Munirathnam's friend and former legendary Sarpatta boxer. Under Rayappan's guidance he regains his fitness and improves his game. In the match, Vembuli dominates in the early rounds and dislocates Kabilan's left shoulder decreasing his punch power and movements, but Rangan, Vetri, Meeran and other members show up and motivate Kabilan to perform his best. In the final round Kabilan knocks Vembuli out, and the Sarpatta clan gains its prime-match victory after years of failure.

Cast 

 Arya as Kabilan Munirathnam
 Dushara Vijayan as Mariyamma (Kabilan's wife)
 Pasupathy as Rangan Vaathiyar (Kabilan's Guru) 
 John Vijay as Kevin, Kabilan's Godfather and also his father's friend (Daddy) 
 Vettai Muthukumar as Thaniga, Raman's uncle
 Kalaiyarasan as Vetriselvan, Rangan Vaathiyar's son 
 John Kokken as Vembuli
 Anupama Kumar as Bakkiyam, Kabilan's mother
 Shabeer Kallarakkal as 'Dancing' Rose
 Santhosh Prathap as Raman
 G. M. Sundar as Duraikannu Vaathiyar, Vembuli's boxing coach
 Kaali Venkat as Koni Chandran
 Sai Tamil as Meeran
 Sanchana Natarajan  as Lakshmi, Vetriselvan's wife
 Priyadarshini Rajkumar as Missiamma, Kevin's wife
 Geetha Kailasam as Rangan Vatthiyar's wife
 Paliya Joke Thangadhurai as 'Tiger Garden' Thangam
 Maran as Maanja Kannan
 Saravana Vel as Gauthaman, Kabilan's friend 
 Gajapathy as  Beedi Raayappan 
 Kishore as Munirathnam, Kabilan's father
 Gana Bala as uncredited role

Production

Etymology 

Sarpatta Parambarai is the name of the movie, The word Sarpatta really means "Four Patta Knives" , The word Paramparai means "Clan", It originates from Tamil word பரண் பரை means 7th generation parent In Tamil. In Urdu it is "چار پٹا" in Hindi it is चार + पट्टा , Meaning – Four Patta knives Clan, Which come from the older clan named Babu Bhai Paramparai, The other clan is " Idiyappa Parambarai" comes from the Tamil words இடி + அப்பா, Meaning they hit like Thunder, There other clan is "Ellappan Chettiar Paramparai".

Development 
Pa. Ranjith shelved his Bollywood debut project based on the life of tribal freedom fighter Birsa Munda, and later worked on another script based on boxing culture of North Chennai in the 1980s. Ranjith initially wrote the script with Surya and Karthi in mind, after working with the latter in Madras (2014), but he could not approach both of them due to their prior commitments in other projects and later narrated the script to Arya, whom he immediately agreed after being convinced with the narration. Ranjith and Arya discussed the progressions of the script and was later finalised in September 2019, with Arya playing a boxer in the film. Tamil Prabha who written the novel Petta, based on life of people living in Chintadripet was announced as the writer. In December 2019, Pa. Ranjith announced the film as a part of their five projects produced under his own banner Neelam Productions, while K9 Studios co-produced the film. Ranjith's norm composer Santhosh Narayanan, and cinematographer Murali G. worked on the project, with Selva R. K. who earlier worked in Ranjith's productions Pariyerum Perumal and Irandam Ulagaporin Kadaisi Gundu was also a part of the technical team. The film was tentatively titled as Salpetta Parambarai and Salpetta, before the official title Sarpatta Parambarai was unveiled with the first look poster was released on 3 December 2020.

Casting 

Arya played the role of Kabilan, a boxer hailing from North Chennai, which he revealed it as the "most challenging role in his career". To portray the role he underwent six hours of training for seven months, with a combination of cardio, boxing and regular gym. As a result, he shed his weight in order to obtain a lean and "ripped" physique. His look from the fiilm was revealed in February 2020, which drew applause from fans. In September 2019, Attakathi Dinesh and Kalaiyarasan who were part of Ranjith's previous films were reported to be a part of the project, as was Magizh Thirumeni. But, excluding Kalaiyarasan, both Dinesh and Thirumeni did not sign the project eventually. In March 2020, Santhosh Prathap was announced to portray a pivotal role in the film. The same month, debutante Dushara Vijayan was announced as the leading lady for the film.

During September 2020, John Kokken announced being a part of the film and worked intensively for the role. Sanchana Natarajan was announced to be an integral part of the film, whose character name was revealed to be Lakshmi. Anupama Kumar played the role of "Bakkiyam", whom she described as "loud", "emotional", "fiery" and "lovable". On 28 March 2021, Pa. Ranjith released a special video introducing the characters of the film which is about the fitness and sports training of the male actors, as well as featuring snippets from the acting workshop, which featured the actors and the supporting artists. Further revealing the character names, it was also revealed that Kaali Venkat, Pasupathy, John Vijay and Shabeer Kallarakkal were playing pivotal roles in the film, the latter as Dancing Rose. Maran (of Ghilli fame) played a supporting role in the film as Maanja Kannan, which will be his posthumous film before his death in May 2021.

Characters 
Pa. Ranjith inspired real life prominent boxers for the characters of the film. Arya's character Kabilan was inspired from the famous American boxer Muhammad Ali, a still from that film released by the makers, resembled that of Muhammad Ali's pose in the film. Vembuli's (John Kokken) role was modelled on Mike Tyson. The character 'Dancing' Rose played by Shabeer Kallarakkal was inspired from the British boxer Naseem Hamed, who was known for his unique fluidic movements that almost mimics a dance form. Santhosh Pratap's character Raman, was based on George Foreman, who is considered to be one of the oldest heavyweight champions in the history of international boxing. The character 'Beedi' Rayappan (played by Gajapathi) too was inspired from Kitheri Muthu, a fisherman-boxer, who was known for defeating a prominent Anglo-Indian boxer Nat Terry. Inspired by Muthu's prowess, Periyar E. V. Ramaswamy, the social activist and the founder of Dravidar Kazhagam, bestowed the title of 'Dravida Veeran' (The Dravidian braveheart) to Muthu.

Filming 
Principal photography was initially scheduled to kickstart in November 2019, but Ranjith delayed the shoot since the male actors underwent extensive training in order to achieve a ripped physique for their roles in the film. The team planned to start the shoot in March 2020, but it was delayed indefinitely due to the COVID-19 lockdown in India which was announced in the same month. The shooting of the film kickstarted on 15 September 2020, after government granted permission to resume shooting with 75-member crew in the sets and was conducted adhering to the safety precautions set for preventing COVID-19 spread. Arya and Kalaiyarasan were present in the shooting of the first schedule where John Kokken joined the sets the following day. The shooting of the film was mostly set in and around North Chennai. Shooting of the film was completed on 14 December 2020, with the entire filming taking place for four months.

Themes and analysis 
The film which is mostly based on the life of North Chennai based boxers, and had influences of political ideologies, unlike Ranjith's previous films Madras, Kabali and Kaala, which focus on the life of the lower-class people and Caste system in Hinduism. It had references to Ambedkarism, Self-Respect Movement and Buddhism, as Ranjith is an ardent follower of the ideologies of B. R. Ambedkar and it was translated in his films to propose the subject of Dalit colossus. In one scene, the film shows about Indian Republic Party (IRP), rooted from Ambedkar's Scheduled Castes Federation.

Harish Wankhede in his critical review in The Hindu argues that the hero Kabilan (Arya) though not significantly different from the masculine versions of earlier Dalit hero (like Kabali and Kaala) however he surely stands distinctly from the earlier Dalit protagonists. We see Kabilan first as a part of passionate audience of boxing game that converts into an underdog boxer and by overcoming the traditional social obstacles he became the ultimate champion of the game. Sarpatta thus escapes the typical social burden of the Dalit hero and places him as a young sportsperson that plays the violent game with dedication and grit. Kabilan is not an ideal hero here but surely it is a promising move towards breaking the Dalit hero's fantasies for machoism, violence and revenge.

Sarpatta Paramabarai is set in the 1970s and to reflect the era, political incidents such as The Emergency, imposed by the then Prime Minister of India, Indira Gandhi during 1975–77 and its opposition Dravida Munnetra Kazhagam (DMK) in Tamil Nadu, then followed by the splitting of the party into two, the latter as All India Anna Dravida Munnetra Kazhagam (AIADMK) by M. G. Ramachandran was portrayed in the film in order to be "realistic". Ranjith told Press Trust of India, "We had to properly handle these political aspects in minute proportions in the movie though the film is not based on Emergency, which serves only as a political backdrop". He added that the boxing culture in India was present in North Madras from pre-Independence times and after India's Independence, the culture has been split into diverse clans. Sarpatta Parambarai also focused on the ground realities of the working-class people.

The film also shows the DMK government being dismissed by the central government in January 1976, over its stand against emergency, and real footages of the arrests of the party members, including politician M. Karunanidhi's son, M. K. Stalin, during the Maintenance of Internal Security (MISA) Act was shown in the film. As a result, there were difficulties in organising boxing matches and the boxers and kabaddi players turned into mercenaries, following lack of employment. Bhagath Veera Arun, a researcher of North Chennai said that "Though boxers hailed from many communities, boxers from the fishing community were dominant in ‘Sarpatta Parambarai’, whose epicentre was Panaimara Thotti, a place in Royapuram".

Music 

Santhosh Narayanan composed the soundtrack and film's score for the film; It marked the composer's fifth consecutive and final film with Pa. Ranjith, since his and the director's debut film Attakathi (2012). According to Santhosh, he said that "the film is influenced by the aspects of Madras, as it is mostly about the descriptive and realistic portrayal of North Chennai, while the boxing culture during the 1970s also serve as the subplot". To stay authentic to the music of that period, Santhosh chose to bring instruments used in the 1970s, instead of echoing film music from that era. Since, the instruments used in that period were made of skin, he met veteran gaana musicians such as Rev Ravi and Gana Bala, who still had access to those instruments. For the background score, Santhosh replicated the theme music of The Hateful Eight originally composed by Ennio Morricone, for this film. The album and score is made with the mix of Tamil folk and brass instrument, as he was inspired by the music of Black Panther (2018), which fused African instruments with orchestral music.

The album featured a theme song under the title "Neeye Oli", which was originally created by Shan Vincent de Paul in collaboration with Santhosh Narayanan and Arivu, who wrote the Tamil lyrics. Shan, who also sung the track with female rap vocals by Navz-47, has created the song for the studio album Made in Jaffna, which was set to be released by the independent music platform Maajja. It was released as a single on 30 June 2021, with the video song released on 16 July, directed by Shan himself with Kalainithan Kalaichelvan as the co-director. The film version of this song was composed and sung by Santhosh, who created a different strophe for this track and also had additional lyrics written by Arivu. Another track for the film is titled "Vambula Thumbula", sung by Santhosh along with Gana Muthu and Isaivani, who were a part of Ranjith's Casteless Collective music band and 'Gana Ulagam' Dharani; the lyrics for this song is written by Kabilan and Madras Meeran. Following popular demand, Santhosh unveiled the theme music for the character Dancing Rose on 28 July 2021. Many critics were appreciative of Santhosh's music and film score, saying it as one of the "key aspects in the film's success".

Release 
Sarpatta Parambarai was initially scheduled for theatrical release, but was later decided for a direct-to-digital release through Amazon Prime Video due to COVID-19-related cinema closures. The film made  prior to its release, including the satellite television rights and Hindi dubbing rights of the film. The broadcast rights of the film was intended to be sold to Colors Tamil and Star Vijay. However, it was later announced that Kalaignar TV, had acquired the television rights.

The film which was originally slated for release on 12 August 2021 during the Independence Day weekend. However, on 8 July 2021, Amazon Prime Video India announced a series of the original shows and contents for the platform's July release, to coincide the Prime Day celebrations (26–27 July), with Sarpatta Parambarai being scheduled for release on 22 July 2021. The date coincided the anniversary of Rajinikanth's Kabali (2016), also directed by Pa. Ranjith. However, Sarpatta Parambarai released earlier on the midnight of 21 July 2021.

Reception 
The film opened to critical acclaim from critics and audience praising the setting, production values, script, direction, music, cinematography and performances of the lead cast in particular. M. Suganth of The Times of India, rated the film 3.5 stars (out of 5), saying "The film’s major success lies in transporting us to the era and ensuring that not a character or a prop feels out of place" and praised the casting and production design. He further added "Even as the drama around boxing keeps us hooked, as in this director’s films, the social and political undertones give us another story in parallel — of another community, which has to fight both inside and outside the ring to reclaim its rights". Sowmya Rajendran of The News Minute too gave 3.5 stars (out of 5) saying "Sarpatta Parambarai is like watching a live match ― it brings the heat of the sport, the excitement of each move, and most of all, the glorious unpredictability of sport". In his review for The Hindu, Srinivasa Ramanujam praised Pa. Ranjith for the setting of North Madras in the 1970s, and further said that "the incorporating of elements such as caste conflict and the question of pride into the sporting milleu makes the film an engaging watch".

Saibal Chatterjee of NDTV called that the film "vivifies a 1970s North Madras milieu in a strikingly effective manner, in the process transporting the audience back in time to a space and culture with its own unique rhythm", further calling "The screenplay, production design and propulsive soundscape serve to create a socio-political and cultural ambience that lends the film's underdog-fighting-all-odds story the shape and scope of an intriguing and enlightening period chronicle even as it plays out on largely familiar genre lines." Giving a score of 3.5 stars (out of 5), Manoj Kumar R of The Indian Express called Sarpatta Parambarai as one of the "best boxing film in the history of Tamil cinema" as "the bar for combat sport films set by Ranjith’s predecessors was quite low; in a way, Ranjith has broken new ground in the genre by simply trying to be mindful of the sport he’s dealing with and tried to show  has tried to show boxing as authentically as possible". He further called "Sarpatta Parambarai isn’t a giant leap for the genre, but it takes first baby steps in the right direction".

A critic from Sify called the film as "a comeback film for both Pa. Ranjith and Arya". Nandini Ramanath of Scroll.in wrote: "Ranjith’s screenplay sets out to layer the average boxing drama with questions about identity politics and the political dynamics of the era. Yet, it is the depiction of the sport and its practitioners that endures over the nearly three hour-long movie." Behindwoods rated three out of five stars for the film, saying "Arya, Pa Ranjith and team have delivered an intense and inspirational sports drama that works well". The Hindustan Times-based critic Haricharan Pudipeddi wrote "Sarpatta Parambarai is already the contender for the best film of the year. But it’ll be more importantly remembered as the film that marked Ranjith’s return to form. This rousing story of an underdog’s triumph set against the boxing culture of North Madras is unmissable, simply because it’s more than a sports drama." Ranjini Krishnakumar of Firstpost gave 4 (out of 5) stars rating and said "Sarpatta Parambarai is a rooted film. Both in writing and direction, Ranjith is in complete control. He straddles his role as a storyteller and an anthropologist with precision. This film certainly packs a punch."

However, Prahlad Srihari of The Quint gave a mixed review saying "Ranjith’s boxing opus throws some forceful punches to the classic underdog story. Only, the end result doesn’t pack much of a wallop". He gave 2 (out of 5) stars for the film. Gauthaman Bhaskaran of News18 wrote "There is much hysteria and dramatics outside the ring, and all these diversions dilute the core plot – probably in the mistakenly belief among producers, writers and directors that the ticket-paying masses want 'wholesome entertainment', which does not quite work in these times." Sudhir Srinivasan of Cinema Express wrote "With this film, Ranjith continues to jab at Indian mythology, while throwing strong punches at anyone who doesn’t stand for equality". Baradwaj Rangan of Film Companion South wrote "It’s rare to find a film where everyone, including the director, is at the top of their game."

Controversies 
In 1980, M. G. Ramachandran brought boxing icon Muhammad Ali to Chennai in order to raise funds for Tamil Nadu Amateur Boxing Association, but it was not showcased by the team. Former Tamil Nadu fisheries minister D. Jayakumar from the AIADMK government, criticised Pa. Ranjith for the portrayal of M. G. Ramachandran in poor light. He further recalled the schemes introduced by MGR to encourage sportspersons from underprivileged backgrounds to participate in international sports events and said "Not only in boxing, MGR also excelled in other sports like maan kombu (a type of martial art), fencing and horse riding. In most of his films, he showcased himself as a sportsman. Inspired by his films, many of his fans took up sports". He further called the film as a "DMK propaganda film", following the incident and also questioned Pa. Ranjith about criticising DMK in the past. MGR Viswanathan, a supporter of Ramachandran too criticised the director and also threatened to protest in front of his residence. One of the kins of boxer Kitheri Muthu pointed out the inaccuracies in the film; it had few dialogues spoken by Arya, that a student of Rangan Vaathiyar defeated Nat Terry in the film, but Kitheri Muthu, who was the first boxer of Sarpatta Parambarai in 1940s, defeated Nat Terry.

Awards and nominations

Impact 
Sarpatta Parambarai became the most watched Tamil film of the year on the streaming service Amazon Prime Video, and became the second-most watched regional film on the platform only bested by Soorarai Pottru (2020), another Amazon original film. Many celebrities such as directors and actors among the Tamil film fraternity, praised the film through social media. A report said that the film has been watched over multiple households living across 3,200 towns and cities in India, and was further streamed in more than 150 countries and territories across the world. A still featuring Kabilan (Arya) and Rangan Vaathiyar (Pasupathy), was widely parodied by netizens and used in internet memes. It was listed as one of the "best Tamil films of 2021" according to several publications: The Indian Express, The News Minute, Hindustan Times, Firstpost, and India Today. According to the social networking site Letterboxd, it also secured the 14th position in the "highest rated International films of 2021". The New York Times listed it as one of "the five best International films to stream on digital platforms". Raj Shinde, critic-based at the Indian news website ThePrint, cited Sarpatta Parambarai as an example on "how Indian film industry being evolved with anti-caste films in 2021".

Sequel 
In March 2023, a sequel was announced, tentatively titled, Sarpatta Parambarai: Round 2, with Pa. Ranjith returning to direct, and Arya returning in the lead role.

See also 
 Bhooloham, a 2015 Tamil-language film, also features the boxing rivalry of North Chennai

References

External links 
 

2020s historical films
2020s sports films
2020s Tamil-language films
2021 action films
2021 direct-to-video films
2021 films
Amazon Prime Video original films
Fictional political parties
Fictional politicians
Films directed by Pa. Ranjith
Film productions suspended due to the COVID-19 pandemic
Films not released in theaters due to the COVID-19 pandemic
Films scored by Santhosh Narayanan
Films set in Chennai
Films set in the 1970s
Films set in the 1980s
Films shot in Chennai
Indian boxing films
Indian direct-to-video films
Indian historical films
Indian sports films
Sports action films